Decipher is the second album by jazz pianist John Taylor, featuring recently late Tony Levin on drums. It was recorded in 1972 and '73, and released on the MPS label. The album is rather obscure and the only recent CD reprint is a Japanese issue (2006), now out of print, which features an astounding 24-bit remastering.

Track listing
All tracks composed by John Taylor
"Cipher/Waiting for Me" - 11:38
"Leaping" - 6:56
"Speak to Me" - 8:53
"Song for a Child " - 3:46
"White Magic" - 5:28

Personnel
John Taylor - piano
Chris Laurence - bass
Tony Levin - drums

References

MPS Records albums
1973 albums
John Taylor (jazz) albums